Malher Tressor Moreno Baldrich (born 11 January 1979) is a Colombian former professional footballer who played as an attacking midfielder.

Club career 
Named after classical music composer Gustav Mahler and famed french Footballer Marius Trésor, Tressor Moreno began his career in the youth ranks of Colombia's Tuluá. In 1999, he emigrated to Peru and made his  professional debut with Peruvian power Alianza Lima. While with Lima he appeared in 40 league matches and scored 16 goals, forming a formidable front line with Claudio Pizarro. During his time with Alianza Moreno was regarded as one of the best foreign players to have played in Peru. The following season he returned to Colombia with Atlético Nacional and had another productive season appearing in 34 league matches and scoring 11 times while helping Nacional to win the 2000 Copa Merconorte. As a result of his play with Nacional, Moreno began to draw interest from European clubs and in 2000 was sold to FC Metz in France.

In 2002, Moreno returned to Colombia as Metz loaned him to América de Cali. While with America, Tressor helped his club to the 2002 Apertura title. For the 2002 Finalización season Moreno was loaned to Independiente Medellín and helped his new club capture the Finalización title. Moreno returned to France for the 2003–04 season, and although he did not have much success with Metz he did help the club avoid relegation. Once his contract with Metz ended he returned to Colombia and played for Deportivo Cali and Once Caldas for the next few seasons.

In 2005, he would embark on a very productive career in Mexico joining Club Necaxa. He was one of Necaxa's star players during the 05/06 season appearing in 29 matches and scoring 5 goals. The following season he would join CD Veracruz and had another fine season appearing in 30 league matches and scoring 8 goals.

In 2007, he would join San Luis and enjoy unprecedented success with the club helping them to a Copa Sudamericana birth in 2008 and a Copa Libertadores birth in 2009. While with San Luis, Moreno appeared in 89 league matches and scored 16 goals, including a brace against Tecos in the 2007 Apertura. In January 2010 Chacarita Juniors was close to signing the Colombian attacking midfielder on loan from San Luis, but the move finally did not materialize and Moreno joined Independiente Medellín for the 2010 league season, 2010 Copa Colombia, and 2010 Copa Libertadores.

He joined Bahia of Brazil on 8 February 2011. However, he never played for the club and in August 2011 signed with Chilean club Santiago Wanderers. He became a regular starter for the club, appearing in 23 games and scoring 1 goal.

Moreno was loaned out to San Jose Earthquakes of Major League Soccer on 2 February 2012.

In January 2013, he went back to Colombia and joined Atlético Huila. Six months later in July, he moved to Barranquilla and joined Junior.

International career 
On 25 July 2000, Moreno debuted with Colombia in a 2002 World Cup qualifier against Ecuador.

He played with Colombia at the 2004 Copa América, scoring two goals, and at the 2005 CONCACAF Gold Cup, scoring once. On 8 June 2005, Moreno scored twice in a 3–0 victory against Ecuador.

International goals 
Scores and results list Colombia's goal tally first.
{| class="wikitable" style="font-size:100%;"
|-
! # !! Date !! Venue !! Opponent !! Score !! Result !! Competition
|+ International goals by date, venue, opponent, and competition
|-

| 1 || 6 June 2004 || Estadio Metropolitano Roberto Meléndez, Barranquilla, Colombia ||  || align=center|2–0 || align=center|5–0 || 2006 World Cup Qualification
|-
| 2 || 7 July 2004 || Estadio Nacional, Lima, Peru ||  || align=center|1–0 || align="center" |1–0 || 2004 Copa América
|-
| 3 || 17 July 2004 || Estadio Mansiche, Trujillo, Peru ||  || align=center|2–0 || align=center|2–0 || 2004 Copa América
|-
| 4 || rowspan="2" |8 June 2005 || rowspan=2|Estadio Metropolitano Roberto Meléndez, Barranquilla, Colombia || rowspan=2| || align=center|1–0 || rowspan=2| || rowspan=2|2006 FIFA World Cup Qualification
|-
| 5 || align="center" |2–0
|-
| 6 || 10 July 2005 || Orange Bowl, Miami, United States ||  || align=center|1–0 || align=center|1–2 || 2005 Gold Cup
|}

 Honours 

 Club 
 Atlético Nacional Copa Merconorte: 2000
 América de CaliCategoría Primera A: 2002-I
 Independiente Medellín'''
Categoría Primera A: 2002-II

Individual 
 CONCACAF Gold Cup Best XI: 2005

References

External links 
 
 
 

1979 births
Living people
Colombian footballers
Colombian expatriate footballers
Colombia international footballers
Club Alianza Lima footballers
C.D. Veracruz footballers
FC Metz players
Club Necaxa footballers
San Luis F.C. players
Deportivo Cali footballers
Once Caldas footballers
América de Cali footballers
Atlético Nacional footballers
Independiente Medellín footballers
Esporte Clube Bahia players
Santiago Wanderers footballers
San Jose Earthquakes players
Atlético Huila footballers
Atlético Junior footballers
Águilas Doradas Rionegro players
Categoría Primera A players
Liga MX players
Chilean Primera División players
Ligue 1 players
2004 Copa América players
2005 CONCACAF Gold Cup players
Expatriate footballers in Chile
Expatriate footballers in Brazil
Expatriate footballers in France
Expatriate footballers in Mexico
Expatriate footballers in Peru
Expatriate soccer players in the United States
Colombian expatriate sportspeople in Chile
Colombian expatriate sportspeople in Brazil
Colombian expatriate sportspeople in France
Colombian expatriate sportspeople in Mexico
Colombian expatriate sportspeople in Peru
Association football midfielders
Association football forwards
Major League Soccer players
Fortaleza C.E.I.F. footballers
Sportspeople from Chocó Department